The Principal York is an historic Grade II listed building on Station Road, adjacent to York railway station, England.   It is a five-storey building of yellow Scarborough brick and was completed in 1878, a year after the present station opened.

The 1853 Hotel
The first York station hotel (The York Royal Station Hotel) was opened on 22 February 1853, the architect was G. T. Andrews, as an addition to York old railway station. The hotel became redundant after the opening of the new station in June 1877 and was converted into offices.

The 1878 Hotel
The new hotel opened on 20 May 1878 as the Royal Station Hotel, York. The architect was William Peachey of the North Eastern Railway. The hotel was designed as an integral part of the new station and the North Eastern Railway Company's flagship hotel, and as such was managed directly by the railway company. It featured elegant, high-ceilinged banqueting rooms and 100 large bedrooms costing 14 shillings a night. It was built by Lucas Brothers.

A 27-room west wing was added in 1896, named Klondyke for the Klondike Gold Rush of the time.

In 1923, ownership and management of the hotel transferred to the London and North Eastern Railway (LNER).

British Transport Hotels

In 1948, Britain's railways were nationalised and with them York's railway hotel. Initially this was as part of the 'Hotels Executive' of the British Transport Commission. The British Transport Hotels brand came about in 1953.
 
In 1981, an annexe was opened. It uses the building of the erstwhile North Eastern Railway catering department. it is called the  Friars Garden Hotel. This was the last investment under nationalised ownership.
 
A typical turnover at this time was 1981's £1,225,000.  This  source stated that there were then 135 bedrooms and 23 in Friar's Garden. At this time 24 rooms were not en-suite.  The Ebor Restaurant had 52 covers. In 2013, this was The Tempus Restaurant.

Privatisation
Under Mrs Thatcher's government ancillary activities of the railways were privatised and this included British Transport Hotels. The sale was held by public tender. The sale inventory dated October 1982 is held by the National Railway Museum at York.

The first purchaser of the hotel in 1983 was Batchshire Limited (later Distinguished Hotels Limited, Seaco Hotels Limited, Venice Simplon Orient Express Hotels Limited, Orient Hotels Limited/Orient Hotels (U.K.) Limited before becoming Belmond Limited), a subsidiary of Sea Containers. The owners in 2013 are Principal Hotel Company.

Completed in 2016, The Principal York hotel underwent a refurbishment of the public areas, 164 rooms and suites and corridors.

References

Grade II listed buildings in York
Railway hotels in England
Hotels established in 1878
Hotels in York